The Danish String Quartet made its debut at the Copenhagen Summer Festival in 2002. The group is known for its performances of classical music as well as its own renditions of traditional Nordic folk music. The quartet has also worked with an extensive range of contemporary Scandinavian composers.

Current members 
 Rune Tonsgaard Sørensen (b. 1983), violin
 Frederik Øland (b. 1984), violin
 Asbjørn Nørgaard (b. 1984), viola
 Fredrik Schøyen Sjölin (b. 1982), cello

History 
Violinists Frederik Øland and Rune Tonsgaard Sørensen and violist Asbjørn Nørgaard met as children at a Danish music summer camp where they played both football and music together, eventually making the transition into a serious string quartet in their teens and studying at Copenhagen's Royal Academy of Music. At the time the name of the group was The Young Danish String Quartet. In 2008, the three Danes were joined by Norwegian cellist Fredrik Schøyen Sjölin and changed the group's name to Danish String Quartet, removing the word Young. The quartet was primarily taught and mentored by Professor Tim Frederiksen and has participated in master classes with the Tokyo and Emerson String Quartets, Alasdair Tait, Paul Katz, Hugh Maguire, Levon Chilingirian and Gábor Takács-Nagy.

Since 2007, the group has curated its own annual festival, DSQ Festival, in Copenhagen. 2016 marked the beginning of Series of Four, the quartet's new concert series in the concert hall of The Royal Danish Academy of Music.

In 2013, the quartet began a three-year appointment at the Chamber Music Society of Lincoln Center's CMS Two Program. The quartet was named a BBC Radio 3 New Generation Artist for 2013-15 and Ensemble of the Year by Musical America in 2019.

Awards and recognition 
 Danish Radio P2 Chamber Music Competition, First Prize and Audienze Prize (2004)
 Jacob Gade Award (2004)
 Trondheim International String Quartet Competition, shared First Prize and Audience Prize (2005)
 Charles Hennen International Chamber Music Competition, First Prize (2005)
 Vagn Holmboe String Quartet Competition, First Prize (2005)
 Danish Music Critics Association Artist Award (2005)
 London International String Quartet Competition, First Prize, Beethoven Prize, Sidney Griller Award, 20th century Prize, Menton Festival Prize (2009)
 Mecklenburg-Vorpommern Festival, NORDMETALL-Ensemble Prize (2010)
 Carl Nielsen Prize (2011)
 Wilhelm Hansen Prize (2015)
 Borletti-Buitoni Trust Award (2016)

In 2017, NPR Music named the quartet's second folk music album, Last Leaf, the Best Classical Album of 2017; in 2019, the quartet was nominated for a Grammy in the Best Chamber Music / Small Ensemble category for its album Prism I.

Discography 
 Prism IV (ECM Records, 2022)
 Prism III (ECM Records, 2021)
 Prism II (ECM Records, 2019)
 Prism I (ECM Records, 2018)
 Last Leaf (ECM Records, 2017)
 Adès, Nørgård & Abrahamsen (ECM Records 2016)
 Brahms/Fuchs: Clarinet Quintets with clarinetist Sebastian Manz (CAvi-music, 2014)
 Wood Works (Dacapo Records, 2014)
 Haydn/Brahms (CAvi-music, 2012)
 Nielsen: String Quartets, Vol. 2 (Dacapo Records, 2008)
 Nielsen: String Quartets, Vol. 1 (Dacapo Records, 2007)

References 

String quartets